Ehagay Nakoda is a multipeaked massif located immediately south of the town of Canmore just east of the Spray Lakes road in Alberta's Canadian Rockies. The mountain sports two subsidiary peaks with commemorative names, Mount Lawrence Grassi (which is the tallest) and Ha Ling Peak on the northwestern end. It also sports two other named peaks: Ship's Prow on the southeastern side, and Miners Peak. The mountain is separated from Mount Rundle by Whiteman's Gap, and is separated to the South from The Three Sisters by Three Sisters Pass.

Name Change
Ehagay Nakoda was formerly named Mount Lawrence Grassi, but the name was changed along with renaming Ha Ling Peak. In 1998, the name of the massif was changed to Ehagay Nakoda, meaning "The Last Nakoda" ("The last human being"), which is derived from a Stoney Nakoda origin story about the mountain's creation. This traditional story told of a Nakoda who was transformed into a mountain by Iktomni (the Trickster, or the Old Man) so that they would remain on this Earth long after human beings cease to inhabit it. The story was submitted by a local Stoney Nakoda Edler, Peter Lazarus Wesley, for the renaming of Chinaman's Peak, but the decision was made to rename the entire massif while also changing the name of Chinaman's Peak to Ha Ling Peak. To respect the history of Lawrence Grassi and the former name of the mountain, the tallest peak was named Mount Lawrence Grassi.

Named Peaks

Mount Lawrence Grassi
The peak is named for Lawrence Grassi (1890–1980), an Italian miner who emigrated to Canada in 1912. After working with the Canadian Pacific Railway for several years he worked in the Canmore coal mines, Grassi also became a well-respected climbing guide as well as building many trails in the area, including one to the Grassi Lakes which also bear his name.

Ha Ling Peak
Ha Ling Peak was previously officially named Chinaman's Peak in 1980, but the name was removed in 1997, underwent a name change in 1998. The peak is named in honour of Ha Ling, who was a Chinese cook working for a mining camp and the first person known to have summited the peak. He bet some coworkers $50 that he could climb the mountain and return in less than ten hours. When he returned in five and a half hours, people doubted him, so he led people up the mountain to where he had planted a small flag, and left behind an even larger flag that could be seen from the nearby town of town of Canmore, Alberta. Ha Ling Peak is the northmost peak of Ehagay Nakoda.

Ship's Prow
Ship's Prow is the South peak of Ehagay Nakoda. It is named for its prominent, ship's prow-like appearance on the end of Ehagay Nakoda as seen from the nearby town of Canmore, Alberta.

Miners Peak
Miners Peak is the first peak Southeast of Ha Ling Peak. Miners Peak was named in honour of the mining community that once worked below the mountain mining coal. Though the name of the peak is often spelled with an apostrophe (i.e., Miner's), this is an incorrect spelling.

The Story of Ehagay Nakoda: The Last Nakoda

As told by Stoney Nakoda Elder Peter Lazarus Wesley.

References 

Two-thousanders of Alberta
Canadian Rockies